Happy Tree Friends is an animated series created and developed by Rhode Montijo, Kenn Navarro, and Warren Graff for Mondo Media. A total of six seasons of the series have been released: five seasons on the internet, and one season on television. 

In 1999, the crew began the series with a pilot episode, named "Banjo Frenzy", which featured a blue dinosaur, a sky blue squirrel, a yellow rabbit, and a purple beaver. The first official episode was named "Spin Fun Knowin' Ya!", which aired on Christmas Eve of that same year, and featured later versions of the dinosaur, rabbit, squirrel, and beaver, and – from that point on – the crew began introducing new characters to the show. It quickly became an internet phenomenon featuring millions of visits per episode. In 2006, the Happy Tree Friends television series aired on G4 in the United States. It also aired on G4 and Razer in Canada in 2007.

A prequel spin-off called Ka-Pow! debuted in September 2008. In 2010, after airing fifteen episodes for the third web season, a hiatus began, in which there were only Break shorts airing with a subliminal message at the end of each, reading "Happy Tree Friends is dead!". This situation concerned many fans because they thought that the series were going to end soon. The writers confirmed that they were playing a joke on the fact that the characters die a lot, making a pun phrase with the word "dead". The hiatus ended on December 8, 2011, allowing the series to return once again with the fifteenth episode of the third season, named "Clause for Concern".

In addition to the show's five seasons and a spin-off, there have been some special episodes and shorts. These include eleven "Smoochies", ten "Kringles", thirteen "Break" shorts, five "Love Bites", and sixteen other irregular episodes that are unindexed. The "Smoochie" shorts involve three different items being dropped next to a main character, only for them to be killed in three different ways, each regarding the item. These have been adapted into the Happy Tree Friends website where one can choose an item to drop. The "Kringle" shorts are Christmas-themed shorts that feature the main characters doing various Christmas-related tasks, only to be killed in various ways. The "Love Bites" were Valentine's Day-themed shorts, that went with the basic structure of a Happy Tree Friends episode. The "Break" shorts were produced in 2008, when no new episodes were produced until the following year. A new break short debuted in 2009.

Series overview

Internet shorts

Season 1 (1999–2001)

Season 2 (2002–2005)

Season 3 (2007–2013)

Season 4 (2013–2014)

Season 5: Still Alive (2016)

Television series (2006)

Other shorts

Smoochies (2003–2008)
Cuddles' Pet Smoochie (January 16, 2003)
Giggles' Valentine Smoochie (February 13, 2003)
Toothy's Easter Smoochie (April 17, 2003)
Petunia's Summer Smoochie (May 15, 2003)
Nutty's Party Smoochie (June 12, 2003)
Sniffles' Science Smoochie (July 3, 2003)
Flaky's Baseball Smoochie (July 17, 2003)
Pop's BBQ Smoochie (July 31, 2003)
Mime's Olympic Smoochie (August 14, 2008)
Disco Bear's Halloween Smoochie (October 10, 2008)
Cub's Christmas Smoochie (December 3, 2008)

Kringles (2004)
Reindeer Kringle
Tree Kringle
Kitchen Kringle
Caroling Kringle
Ski Kringle
Train Kringle
Strain Kringle
Chill Kringle
Sight Kringle
Star Kringle

Ka-Pow! episodes (2008)

Blurbs (2008–2015)
These are videos that feature an original episode that has been done over with a series of speech bubbles that either state a fact relating to a scene, make fun of a goof, or say a joke in a similar style to Mystery Science Theater 3000. Additionally, the episodes that were originally produced in a 4:3 format (standard definition) are remade in a 16:9 format (high-definition).

So far, Mondo Media has aired "Blurbed" versions of the following episodes:

Spin Fun Knowin' Ya
Nuttin' But the Tooth
Eyes Cold Lemonade
Class Act
The Way You Make Me Wheel
Shard at Work
Keepin' It Reel
Let It Slide
Icy You
Hello Dolly
Remains to Be Seen
Stealing the Spotlight
Ski Ya, Wouldn't Wanna Be Ya
Blind Date
Suck It Up
Take a Hike
Read 'em and Weep
Can't Stop Coffin
We're Scrooged!
Just Desert
Peas in a Pod
Wrath of Con
All Flocked Up
Something Fishy
Without a Hitch
Swelter Skelter
I Nub You
See You Later, Elevator
Brake the Cycle

HTF Break (2008–2012)
Seize the Day
Chore Loser
Deck the Halls
We Wish You
Happy New Year
Take Your Seat
Moppin Up
Bite Sized
Pop & Corn
Butter Me Up
Cheesy Does It
Tunnel Vision
Claw

Love Bites (2009–2012)
Cold Hearted
Sea of Love
I Heart U
On My Mind
My Better Half

See also
 Happy Tree Friends
 List of Happy Tree Friends home video releases

Notes

References

External links
 Watch Happy Tree Friends episodes 
 Happy Tree Friends Halloween minisite 
 Happy Tree Friends holiday minisite 

Happy Tree Friends
Lists of web series episodes
Lists of American adult animated television series episodes 
Lists of American comedy television series episodes
Lists of Canadian comedy television series episodes